Peter Okoye (born 18 November 1981), who is better known as Mr P, is a Nigerian singer. He rose to fame in the 2000s as a member of the P-Square duo with his identical twin brother  Rudeboy and in 2021 was awarded with an honorary Doctorate degree from ESCAE University in Benin Republic.

Early life and education 

Mr. P and his twin brother Rudeboy grew up in a large family, in Jos in Plauteau State, Nigeria. He was born into the family of Josephine Okoye and Mazi Moses Okoye. 

Peter and his brother Paul joined a school of music and drama club, where they started dancing, singing and performing songs of popular artist like  MC Hammer, Bobby Brown and Michael Jackson.

Solo career

In 2017, a disbandment of P-Square was made and both band members parted ways. Mr P first dropped his solo single titled "For My Head", "Cool It Down" in 2017. 

In 2018 Mr. P collaborated with Nyanda of Brick & Lace on a song titled "Wokie Wokie". In 2021, Mr. P founded his own record label called PClassic Label, the label has signed Nigerian activist and disc jockey DJ Switch and in 2021, he released a 16-track debut album titled, The Prodigal which featured Tiwa Savage, Simi, Teni, Wande Coal, Tamar Braxton, Singah, Mohombi, DJ Switch, and OvieKelz.

Personal life
In 2013 Peter Okoye and his then-girlfriend, Lola Omotayo welcomed their daughter Aliona in a San Francisco hospital in the United States.   On 17 November 2013 the duo got married at the Ark in Lekki, Lagos, Nigeria.

Endorsement deals 
On June 16, 2016, Mr P was made a Kia motor ambassador. Mr. P was also made a brand ambassador for Olympic milk, produced by Nutricima limited. Peter founded a reality TV show named Dance with Peter which was sponsored by Globacom Telecommunication Limited. In August 2021, he was unveiled as the brand ambassador of Adidas, a manufacturing company that deals with shoes, clothing and accessories.

References 

Living people
1981 births
21st-century Nigerian male singers
Nigerian male singer-songwriters
Yoruba musicians
Nigerian record producers